Rustam Stanislavovich Totrov (born 15 July 1984) is a Russian Greco-Roman wrestler. He won the silver medal at the 2012 Summer Olympics in the men's Greco-Roman 96 kg category.

External links
 bio on fila-wrestling.com
 wrestrus.ru

1984 births
Living people
Sportspeople from Vladikavkaz
Russian male sport wrestlers
Olympic wrestlers of Russia
Wrestlers at the 2012 Summer Olympics
Olympic silver medalists for Russia
Olympic medalists in wrestling
Medalists at the 2012 Summer Olympics
World Wrestling Championships medalists
21st-century Russian people